Marilyn Leavitt-Imblum (August 1, 1946 – August 14, 2012) was an American cross-stitch embroidery designer known especially for her Victorian angel designs. Her designs were published under the business name Told in a Garden, with product divisions of Told in a Garden, Lavender and Lace, and Butternut Road.

Biography

Early life
Marilyn J. Leavitt was born August 1, 1946, in Youngstown, Ohio, where she attended Ursuline High School. She was the daughter of Marcella (née O'Toole) and Earle Leavitt. She had one brother, Bruce.

Career
Her professional design career began in the 1960s, working as an advertising and fashion illustrator for Strouss and Hartzell, Rose and Sons.

Leavitt-Imblum began publishing embroidery designs around 1986, when she showed her original design "The Quilting", depicting an Amish quilting bee, to the owner of a local needlework shop who told her that if she graphed the design the shop would sell it. The first 25 copies sold almost immediately. Within a decade, her Victorian angel designs were considered among the most popular cross-stitch designs available. In 2000, she publicly stated her opposition to the unlicensed sharing of needlework patterns on the Internet.

Personal life
She was married three times and had six children: Jeff, Nora, and Elizabeth Adams, Corriander "Corrie" Ferenchak, and Matt and Sarah Imblum. She had multiple sclerosis but did not widely publicize the fact. She died on August 14, 2012, in Newark, New York, aged 66.

Her daughter Nora is an artist and fellow cross-stitch embroidery designer, under her married name, Nora Corbett.

References

External links
Told in a Garden: official website for Marilyn Leavitt-Imblum 
"Designer Spotlight" on website for Caron Collection company (specializes in variegated embroidery thread)
Yahoo discussion group dedicated to Marilyn Leavitt-Imblum designs

1946 births
2012 deaths
American women illustrators
American illustrators
American textile artists
Embroidery designers
Artists from Youngstown, Ohio
Deaths from multiple sclerosis
Neurological disease deaths in New York (state)
People from Newark, New York
Women textile artists
21st-century American women